Pop Negro is the third studio album by el Guincho. It was released on 13 September 2010 by Young Turks. Pop Negro was named best Spanish album of 2010 by Rockdelux, while the single "Bombay" and its music video, directed by Nicolás Méndez, were named best song and best music video. The music video for "Bombay" also serves as part of the trailer for a larger film by Méndez, with music by el Guincho.

Critical reception

At Metacritic, which assigns a normalized rating out of 100 to reviews from mainstream critics, the album has an average score of 74 based on 13 reviews, indicating "generally favorable reviews". Laura Snapes of NME described the style of the album as "all the tropicalia and beach-lusting melodies of Animal Collective, Panda Bear and Fool's Gold put together."

Track listing

References

External links
 "Bombay," The Music Video
 Bombay, The Film
 YOUNG TURKS, El Guincho: Pop Negro

2010 albums
Albums produced by el Guincho
El Guincho albums
Young Turks (record label) albums